Akdoğan is a village in the District of Kızılcahamam, Ankara Province, Turkey. As of 2000, it had a population of 306 people.

Akdoğan is the Turkish word for gyrfalcon. At the old time some Turkish Oghuz people came to here. They found out a place to establish their village. At the same time their white falcon was flying on this place. After that they decided to place there. They gave name Akdoğan, because of their bird. 
Today Akdoğan's population is about 50 people. Villagers' the most important meal tickets are agriculture and animal selling. Generally these animals are goats, sheep and cows. 
Climate is general Anatolian inland climate but rain is more than normal. 
In the village there are a post office, a mosque. 
Akdoğan is 11 km far to Kızılcahamam and 70 km far to Ankara. Buses which come from Old Etlik Garages are pass to incide of the village.
Village's mukhtar (Sheriff) is Hayrun Özdemir. 
Akdoğan has a festival which is started in 2007. Its name is Ak-Der Fest.

References

Villages in Kızılcahamam District